Jeremy P. Chittenden is professor of plasma physics and co-director of the Centre for Inertial Fusion Studies at Imperial College London.

References

External links
https://www.researchgate.net/scientific-contributions/Jeremy-Chittenden-2024791850

British physicists
Academics of Imperial College London
Living people
Year of birth missing (living people)
Place of birth missing (living people)
Fellows of the American Physical Society